Gaselys is a LNG carrier of Gaz de France. When taken into service in 2007, she and her sister ship Provalys were the largest LNG carriers in existence.

External links

Gaselys: new LNG carrier strengthens Gaz de France's fleet

LNG tankers
Ships built in Barrow-in-Furness
2006 ships
Tankers of France